The 2008–09 Buffalo Sabres season was the 39th season of operation for the Buffalo Sabres in the National Hockey League, their 38th season of play.

Pre-season
In their second pre-season game, the Sabres played the Montreal Canadiens in Roberval, Quebec, the 2008 winner of the Kraft Hockeyville contest. In their newly renovated arena, Roberval hosted the preseason game on Tuesday, September 23, 2008. Montreal scored the first three goals, then held off Buffalo for a 3–2 win in at Benoit-Levesque Arena.

Regular season

Divisional standings

Conference standings

Schedule and results
 Green background indicates win (2 points).
 Red background indicates regulation loss (0 points).
 White background indicates overtime/shootout loss (1 point).

Playoffs
The Buffalo Sabres failed to qualify for the 2009 NHL Playoffs.

Player statistics

Skaters

Goaltenders

†Denotes player spent time with another team before joining Sabres. Stats reflect time with Sabres only.
‡Traded mid-season. Stats reflect time with Sabres only.

Awards and records

Records

Milestones

Transactions

Trades

Free agents

Claimed from waivers

Draft picks
Buffalo's picks at the 2008 NHL Entry Draft in Ottawa, Ontario.

See also
 2008–09 NHL season

Farm teams
On June 11, the Buffalo Sabres signed a three-year deal with the Portland Pirates of the American Hockey League, ending a 29-year affiliation with the Rochester Americans.

References

Buffalo Sabres seasons
B
B
Buffalo
Buffalo